Yuliia Yuriichuk (born 1 July 1998) is a Ukrainian canoeist. She represented Ukraine at the 2020 Summer Olympics.

Sports career
Before having qualified for 2020 Summer Olympics, Yuriichuk rarely competed at international level. Nevertheless, she managed to qualify to Tokyo during the 2021 Cup of Ukraine.

Yuriichuk competed in two events at the Games in Tokyo. In the K-1 200 metres event, she finished 5th in heat 4 and 5th in quarterfinal 2. In the K-1 500 metres event, she finished 5th in heat 2, 3rd in quarterfinal 1 and 8th in semifinal 2.

Personal life
She graduated from Tychyna Pedagogical University. Her hobby is travelling.

References

Links
 Profile on the International Canoe Federation's website
 

1998 births
Living people
Ukrainian female canoeists
People from Uman
Canoeists at the 2020 Summer Olympics
Olympic canoeists of Ukraine
Sportspeople from Cherkasy Oblast